Beñat Turrientes Imaz (born 31 January 2002) is a Spanish professional footballer who plays as a midfielder for Real Sociedad.

Club career
Born in Beasain, Gipuzkoa, Basque Country, Turrientes joined Real Sociedad's youth setup in 2014, aged 12. He made his senior debut with the C-team on 8 September 2019, starting in a 0–0 Tercera División home draw against CD Vitoria.

On 20 September 2019, Turrientes renewed his contract until 2025. Promoted to the reserves ahead of the 2020–21 campaign, he featured in 16 matches as the side returned to Segunda División after 59 years.

Turrientes made his professional debut on 21 August 2021, starting in a 0–0 away draw against CD Lugo. He made his first team – and La Liga – debut on 26 September, starting in a 1–0 home win over Elche CF.

On 7 August 2022, Turrientes was definitely promoted to the main squad, being assigned the number 22 jersey.

Honours 
Real Sociedad B

 Segunda División B:  2020–21

References

External links
Profile at the Real Sociedad website

2002 births
Living people
People from Beasain
Sportspeople from Gipuzkoa
Spanish footballers
Footballers from the Basque Country (autonomous community)
Association football midfielders
La Liga players
Segunda División players
Segunda División B players
Tercera División players
Real Sociedad C footballers
Real Sociedad B footballers
Real Sociedad footballers
Spain youth international footballers
Spain under-21 international footballers